Hasan ʿAwad al-Qatshan (born 1912–13) was a Bedouin archaeologist associated with the Jordanian Department of Antiquities. Working with his partner Gerald Lankester Harding and other western archaeologists, he played a role in a number of major discoveries, including those of the Lachish letters and the Dead Sea Scrolls.

Archaeological career 
ʿAwad was born to the Negev Bedouin Hanajira of Beersheba. Though not formally educated in archaeology, he began his training as a teenager, on Flinders Petrie's excavations at Tell Jemmeh (1926–1927). He went on to acquire a reputation as a skilled excavator and the "best archaeological foreman in Jordan", working with James Leslie Starkey at Tell ed-Duweir (Lachish, 1932–1939), George Ernest Wright at Tell Balata (Shechem, 1956–1973), the American Schools of Oriental Research at Dhiban (1950–1953), Henri de Contenson at Tell esh-Shuna (1953), and Diana Kirkbride at Petra (1955–1956). Harding credited ʿAwad with the discovery of the Lachish letters, and he was the first archaeologist to recognise the importance of the El-Kerak Inscription, which he bought from a Bedouin in Tafilah.

ʿAwad's most frequent collaborator was Gerald Lankester Harding, who he first met at Tell Jemmeh. They were partners for nearly twenty years and lived together in Amman, where Harding was the director of the Department of Antiquities. ʿAwad conducted a excavated a number of sites in Jordan on Harding's behalf, including the Iron Age tombs at Sahab. In 1952, Harding heard that local Bedouin had found a new cave at Qumran Caves, the site of the discovery the Dead Sea Scrolls. ʿAwad joined Harding's expedition to the caves along with Dominique Barthélemy, Józef Milik, Henri de Contenson, Roland de Vaux, Azmi Khalil, and Ibrahim Assula, and was responsible for supervising the party's Bedouin labourers. John M. Allegro recounted Hasan's role in one episode during the exploration of the caves:

References

External links 
 Harding & His Camera, documentary film about Harding and ʿAwad

Year of birth uncertain
Year of death unknown
Bedouins
Scientists from Beersheba
Jordanian archaeologists